Tofig Ismayilov is the name of:

 Tofig Ismayilov (film director) (1939–2016), Azerbaijani film director, screenwriter and film scholar
 Tofig Ismayilov (politician) (1933–1991), first Secretary of State of Azerbaijan

See also
 Tofiq Ismayilov Stadium, a multi-use stadium in Surakhani, Baku, Azerbaijan